Águeda Isabel Ruiz de la Prada y Sentmenat, 13th Marchioness of Castelldosríus, 29th Baroness of Santa Pau, GE (born 22 July 1960), better known as Agatha Ruiz de la Prada, is a Spanish fashion designer and aristocrat.

Biography
Ágatha entered fashion in 1981 with her women´s collection in Madrid. She opened her first studio in the Spanish capital and began to participate in fashion shows in Madrid and Barcelona. Agatha was a promoter of the “Movida Madrileña,” an artistic and Cultural Revolution in the 1980s.

Commercial success came with her partnership with El Corte Inglés. She started to gain international recognition by means of her fashion shows in Spain, France, Italy, Colombia, USA, Puerto Rico, Santo Domingo and exhibitions in Tokyo, New York, Paris, Moscow and Bucharest.

In 1991, Agatha licensed her brand, expanding her line to include men's, women's and children's fashion, ceramics, toys, shoes, linens and towels, make-up and more. Her stores are located in Madrid, Barcelona, Paris, Milan, New York, Oporto and Mallorca, and she is present in over 140 countries around the world. This year, on the occasion of the 30th Anniversary of her first fashion show, she inaugurated her Foundation.

Her perfumes belong to Puig company.

In 2010, she was granted the titles of Marchioness of Castelldosríus (which has attached to it a Grandeeship) and Baroness of Santa Pau after a legal battle with her uncle.

In 2015, Miley Cyrus chose two of her sculptural dresses for the MTV Video Music Awards, who said "Gatize" when wearing her designs and was the best representation of the brand's spirit.

Personal life

She had a relationship Pedro J. Ramirez and they have two children, Tristán (b. 1987) and Cósima (b. 1990). In 2016 they separated, three months after their marriage in Madrid. They divorced in 2017. Her daughter, Cósima Ramírez always wears Agatha Ruiz de la Prada's designs when attending public and private events.

References

External links
Ágatha Ruíz de la Prada – official website.
Agatha Ruiz de la Prada Foundation.
MFW Announces 2009 Special Guest Designer Agatha Ruiz de la Prada

Spanish fashion designers
Spanish women fashion designers
People from Madrid
1960 births
Living people
Grandees of Spain